David Besnard, (born 21 January 1977 in Sydney, Australia) is a retired professional racing driver.

Career history
Starting in karts in 1991, he quickly proceeded into Formula Ford in 1995. After initial success, he had a major accident at Eastern Creek Raceway and broke his leg. In 1996 he made a comeback and won the Australian title. He made a venture to the United States, with a small budget, and limited success. In 1998, he returned to win the U.S F2000 National Championship. 1999, saw David enter the US Formula Atlantic Championship. After a heavy crash at Nazareth Speedway, the team had to buy a new chassis and ran out of budget halfway through the season. 2000 saw Besnard again in the United States, running various Sports Car races, until Stone Brothers Racing picked him up for the Konica V8 Supercar Series and the Bathurst 1000. From there he drove with Stone Brothers for several seasons, with the highlight being winning the 2002 Queensland 500 with Simon Wills. He raced with Ford Performance Racing for one season in 2003, and WPS Racing for three seasons following that.

In 2004, with his links with WPS, a drive in the Champ Car World Series came about at Surfers Paradise. His finishing position of seventh is still the highest finish for an Australian at that event (but bettered by Ryan Briscoe's 2008 IRL win after the CCWS collapsed). After being dropped by WPS in 2006 Besnard has been racing in the New Zealand Touring Car Championship, picking up an endurance race co-driver role with Stone Brothers Racing in 2007, paired with James Courtney, which resulted in a second place at Bathurst.

Motorsports career results

Career summary

GrandAm Championship

Complete American open-wheel racing results
(key)

Atlantic Championship

Champ Car World Series

Supercars Championship results
(Races in bold indicate pole position) (Races in italics indicate fastest lap)

Complete Bathurst 1000 results

‡ Besnard replaced Kelly due to illness

References

 Conrod V8 Profile & Stats
 Speedsport Profile & stats
 Driver Database profile
 Racing Reference – US Racing stats

External links
 Official Web page

1977 births
Living people
Atlantic Championship drivers
Champ Car drivers
Formula Ford drivers
Racing drivers from Sydney
Rolex Sports Car Series drivers
Sportsmen from New South Wales
Toyota Racing Series drivers
U.S. F2000 National Championship drivers
Supercars Championship drivers
Garry Rogers Motorsport drivers
Walker Racing drivers
Stone Brothers Racing drivers
Dick Johnson Racing drivers